Vicenta Arenas Mayor (born 26 January 1975) is a retired Spanish goalball player who competed in international level events.

References

1975 births
Living people
Sportspeople from Valencia
Paralympic goalball players of Spain
Goalball players at the 1992 Summer Paralympics
Goalball players at the 1996 Summer Paralympics